The 2017 Tulsa tornado took place on August 6, 2017, near Tulsa, Oklahoma. Major damage was inflicted on a shopping and office area in midtown Tulsa. There were no fatalities, although 30 people were injured. It was part of a small outbreak of four tornadoes that formed along a bow echo.

Confirmed tornadoes

August 6 event

Tulsa, Oklahoma

The tornado formed at 1:19 A.M. CDT (Or Local Time) (06:19 UTC) south of East 36th Street South and east of South Harvard Avenue and eventually shifted west before heading to Broken Arrow, Oklahoma at around 1:25 A.M.  The worst damage along its  path was in midtown Tulsa (between South Sheridan Road and South Yale Avenue, near East 41st Street South), where several buildings had their roofs removed and outer walls collapsed. The 18-story Remington Tower office building (near Skelly Drive and 41st Street) underwent dramatic facade and window damage. Many offices in the building were further damaged by having equipment and furnishings inside sucked through the windows and falling to the ground below. The tornado also caused roof and structural damage to Promenade Mall and impacted infrastructure at the BOK Financial Corporation operations center (near 41st and Sheridan), rendering its online, mobile and automated telephone systems inoperable.  More than 7 people were rescued from T.G.I. Friday's at 41st and Yale Avenue, after the roof collapsed into the building.

This was the first tornado to hit the Tulsa area in the month of August since 1958 (and only the 3rd to strike the area since 1950), the tornado injured 26 people – with two seriously injured – in the east part of the city.  Even with the tornado detectable on radar, the Tulsa County Emergency Management Agency did not begin civil defense sirens in the area because the National Weather Service did not issue a tornado warning until 1:25 a.m., after which time an EF1 tornado had entered Broken Arrow, damaging multiple home roofs and several large tree branches.  A second EF1 hit east of Oologah at 1:32 a.m. CDT (06:32 UTC), damaging several trees, barns and a home, downing multiple telephone poles.

See also
 List of North American tornadoes and tornado outbreaks

Notes

References

F2 tornadoes
2017 in Oklahoma
August 2017 events in the United States
2017 tornado
Tornadoes in Oklahoma
Tornadoes of 2017